Altamont Pass, formerly Livermore Pass, is a low mountain pass in the Diablo Range of Northern California between Livermore in the Livermore Valley and Tracy in the San Joaquin Valley. The name is actually applied to two distinct but nearby crossings of the range.

Of the two railroad lines through the old pass, one is still in use: the ex-Western Pacific line built in 1908 over the pass, which is sometimes known as the Altamont Corridor, now owned by Union Pacific. It carries freight trains as well as the Altamont Corridor Express, which gives its occasional name (ACE) and operates between Stockton, Livermore, Pleasanton, Fremont, and San Jose. The other and older right-of-way was the line built in 1869 with a 1,200-foot long summit tunnel by the original Western Pacific Railroad (1862-1870) as part of the transcontinental railroad.  After 1879, when a sea level ferry crossing at the Carquinez Strait replaced the 1869 route, it remained in use for other purposes by the Southern Pacific. In 1984 it was abandoned and deeded to Alameda County by Southern Pacific Railroad in favor of trackage rights on the aforementioned ex-Western Pacific line.

From 1966 to 2008, the Altamont Pass area was home to the Altamont Speedway, which became famous as the site of the 1969 Altamont Free Concert, a large outdoor concert featuring The Rolling Stones and marred by violence. The pass is also known for the Altamont Pass Wind Farm, one of the earliest in the United States.

History 
From the time of the California Gold Rush, what is now Altamont Pass was called Livermore's Pass after Robert Livermore, the owner of the Rancho Las Positas and a way station near the pass.  After the transcontinental railroad was built through the pass by Chinese laborers in 1869, Altamont, formerly The Summit, was established in 1872. Eventually the pass took the name of the town, but the site is now essentially uninhabited.

Gallery

See also 
 Altamont Corridor Express
 Altamont Pass Wind Farm
 Mountain House
 Tri-Valley-San Joaquin Valley Regional Rail Authority

References

External links 

 30 photos of Altamont Pass Wind Farm
 Altamont Pass image

Mountain passes of California
Diablo Range
Landforms of Alameda County, California
Livermore Valley
Rail mountain passes of the United States
Interstate 80
Livermore, California
Tracy, California
Lincoln Highway
U.S. Route 50